Nicholas Paul (born 23 September 1998) is a Trinidadian track cyclist, who specializes in sprinting events.

Career
On 6 September 2019, Paul set a flying 200m world record of 9.100 seconds at the Elite Pan American Track Cycling Championships in Coachabamba, Bolivia. The previous record of 9.347 seconds by France's Francois Pervis had stood since 2013.

At the 2020 Tokyo Olympics, in the quarterfinals of the sprint competition, Paul won his first ride against Denis Dmitriev (ROC) but was disqualified in the second ride for not holding his line in the final sprint. Paul went on to lose the third ride controversially when Dmitriev cut in front of him in the sprinter's lane but the appeal from the Trinidad & Tobago Olympic Committee was denied.

In September 2021, Paul participated in the UCI Track Nations Cycling Cup, coming away with triple Golds in the Kilo Time Trial, Keirin & Sprints. In October of that year, Paul earned a silver in the Kilo Time Trial at the UCI World Championships.

At the 2022 Commonwealth Games, Paul took gold in the keirin, beating Jack Carlin of Scotland and Shah Sahrom of Malaysia. His victory ended Trinidad and Tobago's 52-year wait for a medal in cycling at the Commonwealth Games. He also won a silver medal in the sprint event. He also won a bronze medal in the 1km Time Trial event.

Major results

2015
1st Kilometer, Junior National Track Championships
2017
1st Sprint, National Track Championships
2nd  Team sprint, Pan American Track Championships (with Kwesi Browne & Njisane Phillip)
2018
Central American and Caribbean Games
1st  Kilometer
1st  Sprint
1st  Team sprint (with Kwesi Browne & Njisane Phillip)
Pan American Track Championships
1st  Team sprint (with Kwesi Browne & Njisane Phillip)
2nd  Sprint 
3rd  Kilometer
2021
UCI Nations Cup
1st  Kilometer
1st  Keirin
1st  Sprint
 UCI World Track Championships
2nd  Kilometer
4th Keirin
2022
Commonwealth Games
1st  Keirin
2nd  Sprint
3rd 1km Time Trial

References

External links

1998 births
Living people
Trinidad and Tobago male cyclists
Trinidad and Tobago track cyclists
People from Gasparillo
Central American and Caribbean Games gold medalists for Trinidad and Tobago
Competitors at the 2018 Central American and Caribbean Games
Pan American Games medalists in cycling
Pan American Games gold medalists for Trinidad and Tobago
Cyclists at the 2019 Pan American Games
Central American and Caribbean Games medalists in cycling
Medalists at the 2019 Pan American Games
Cyclists at the 2020 Summer Olympics
Olympic cyclists of Trinidad and Tobago
Cyclists at the 2022 Commonwealth Games
20th-century Trinidad and Tobago people
21st-century Trinidad and Tobago people
Commonwealth Games gold medallists for Trinidad and Tobago
Commonwealth Games silver medallists for Trinidad and Tobago
Commonwealth Games medallists in cycling
Medallists at the 2022 Commonwealth Games